Ambrisentan (U.S. trade name Letairis; E.U. trade name Volibris; India trade name Pulmonext by MSN labs)  is a drug indicated for use in the treatment of pulmonary hypertension.

The peptide endothelin constricts muscles in blood vessels, increasing blood pressure. Ambrisentan, which relaxes those muscles, is an endothelin receptor antagonist, and is selective for the type A endothelin receptor (ETA). Ambrisentan significantly improved exercise capacity (6-minute walk distance) compared with placebo in two double-blind, multicenter trials (ARIES-1 and ARIES-2). Like all endothelin receptor antagonists, Ambrisentan is contraindicated in pregnant women as well as those who are trying to  become pregnant, due to the potential for teratogenic effects on the fetus. Patients who are on the Ambrisentan must enroll in the Ambrisentan (Letairis) REMS Program.

Ambrisentan was approved by the U.S. Food and Drug Administration (FDA) and the European Medicines Agency (EMA), and designated an orphan drug, for the treatment of pulmonary hypertension.

Clinical uses 
Ambrisentan is indicated for the treatment of pulmonary arterial hypertension (WHO Group 1) in patients with WHO class II or III symptoms to improve exercise capacity and delay clinical worsening.

Mechanism of action 
Ambrisentan is a drug that blocks endothelin, an endogenous hormone found in higher quantities in patients with pulmonary arterial hypertension. Endothelin binds to two receptors, ETA and ETB. ETA is responsible for cell growth in the vessels as well as vasoconstriction, while ETB plays a role in vasodilation, endothelin 1 clearance, and antiproliferation of cells.

Birth defects
Endothelin receptor activation mediates strong pulmonary vasoconstriction and positive inotropic effect on the heart. These physiologic effects are vital for the development of the fetal cardiopulmonary system. In addition to this, endothelin receptors are also known to play a role in neural crest cell migration, growth, and differentiation. As such, endothelin receptor antagonists such as Ambrisentan are known to be teratogenic.

Ambrisentan has a high risk of liver damage, and of birth defects if a woman becomes pregnant while taking it. In the U.S., doctors who prescribe it, and patients who take it, must enroll in a special program, the LETAIRIS Education and Access Program (LEAP), to learn about those risks. Ambrisentan is available only through specialty pharmacies.

Hepatic impairment 
Ambrisentan is not recommended in patients with moderate or severe hepatic impairment. The medication should also be discontinued if the liver aminotransferase enzymes for the patients are increased more than fivefold, or if the elevations are more than twofold and are accompanied by changes in bilirubin.

Publications

References

External links
 

Endothelin receptor antagonists
Diphenylmethanol ethers
Gilead Sciences
Orphan drugs
Pyrimidines
Acetic acids